St Finian's GAA may refer to:

St Finian's (Newcastle) GAA, a sports club in south-west Dublin, Ireland
St Finian's (Swords) GAA, a sports club in the River Valley area of north Dublin, Ireland